The 1955–56 season was the 48th year of football played by Dundee United, and covers the period from 1 July 1955 to 30 June 1956. United finished in eighth place in the Second Division.

Match results
Dundee United played a total of 45 competitive matches during the 1955–56 season.

Legend

All results are written with Dundee United's score first.
Own goals in italics

Second Division

Scottish Cup

League Cup

See also
 1955–56 in Scottish football

References

Dundee United F.C. seasons
Dundee United